Poibang Pohshna (born 24 August 1988 in Meghalaya) is an Indian professional footballer who last played as a defender for Rangdajied United F.C. in the I-League.

Career
From 2007 to 2010, Pohshna played for East Bengal. He then joined Rangdajied United F.C. for whom he made his I-League debut for on 22 September 2013 against Prayag United S.C. in which he started and played the full match as Rangdajied lost the match 0–2.

International
Pohshna represented the India U19 side during the 2006 AFC Youth Championship, which was held in India, where he played 3 matches.

Career statistics

References

External links 
 Profile at I-league.org
 Profile at Goal.com

1988 births
Living people
Indian footballers
Rangdajied United F.C. players
Association football forwards
I-League players
India youth international footballers
Footballers from Meghalaya
East Bengal Club players